Denmark competed at the 1998 Winter Olympics in Nagano, Japan. The nation won its first ever medal at the Winter Olympic Games, a silver by the women's curling team.

Medalists

Alpine skiing

Men

Men's combined

Women

Cross-country skiing

Men

1 Starting delay based on 10 km results. 
C = Classical style, F = Freestyle

Curling

Women's tournament

Group stage
Top four teams advanced to semi-finals.

|}

Medal round
Semi-final

Gold medal game

Figure skating

Men

Freestyle skiing

Women

Snowboarding

Men's giant slalom

References
Official Olympic Reports
International Olympic Committee results database
 Olympic Winter Games 1998, full results by sports-reference.com

Nations at the 1998 Winter Olympics
1998
Winter Olympics